Rum Jungle is a locality in the Northern Territory of Australia located about 105 kilometres south of Darwin on the East Branch of the Finniss River.  It is the site of a uranium deposit, found in 1949, which has been mined.

The area derives its name from an incident when a thief stole 750 ounces of gold from miners after getting them drunk with rum.

Original uranium mine
George Goyder noted an unidentified copper-like green ore in 1869 at "Giants Reef", which was later "rediscovered" and identified to be torbernite.

In 1949, John Michael "Jack" White discovered torbernite in old nearby copper shafts.

In 1952 the Australian Government funded the setting up of a mine and treatment plant to provide uranium oxide concentrate to the UK-US Combined Development Agency under a contract which ran from 1953 to 1962. Rum Jungle was then the largest construction in the Northern Territory. The Government, through the Australian Atomic Energy Commission, was responsible for the mine, although management of it was on a contract basis by Territory Enterprises Pty Limited, a subsidiary of the Rio Tinto Group. A town called Batchelor was built 8 km south of the mine to accommodate the mining personnel. The project was officially opened in September 1954.

Pollution and cleanup
The Rum Jungle mine closed in April 1971  and the  site was abandoned. The Federal Government (which controlled the mine through its agency the Australian Atomic Energy Commission (AAEC), now known as Australian Nuclear Science and Technology Organisation (ANSTO)) decided not to rehabilitate the mine site . The mining company Conzinc (now part of the Rio Tinto Group, which owns Energy Resources of Australia (ERA), operators of the Ranger Uranium Mine in Kakadu National Park) have consistently denied any responsibility for rehabilitation. This led to the mine becoming known as one of Australia's most polluted environments due to the oxidation of sulphides and the release of acid and metals into the East Branch of the Finniss River. The 1500 mm annual rainfall, along with the pyritic mineralisation in the area, created ideal conditions for such oxidation.

An initial attempt to clean up Rum Jungle was made in 1977, which led to the setting up of a working group to examine more comprehensive rehabilitation. A $16.2 million Commonwealth-funded program got under way in 1983 to remove heavy metals and neutralise the tailings.

One of the principal problems associated with rehabilitating the Rum Jungle Creek South (RJCS) open cut was that the area was converted to a lake after mining ceased, and as the only water body in the Darwin region not infested with crocodiles, the site quickly became very popular with locals and Darwin residents as a recreation reserve including activities such as swimming, canoeing and scuba diving.  After mining, the area suffered elevated gamma radiation, alpha-radioactive dust, and significant radon daughter concentrations in air. These levels were so high that in the late 1980s it was decided that something had to be done . Radiation protection standards were being revised, so that the levels of pollution would now be officially recognised as unsafe for human health. As a result, a supplementary $1.8 million program to improve Rum Jungle Creek South waste dumps was undertaken in 1990.

One of the main environmental impacts of uranium mining is the creation of large volumes of radioactive mine waste (tailings) which are left behind on the site. The major radioactive component of these tailings is uranium-238, which makes up over 99% of what is naturally occurring uranium, and is not very radioactive. While figures concerning the half-life of an isotope are often presented as meaning the element is more dangerous, in the case of Uranium-238 being 4.47 billion years, the opposite is in fact true: half-life is the time in which half of a collection of an element will decay, and produce a radioactive particle, ergo, the longer the half-life, the less radioactive the element. In 2003, a government survey of the tailings piles at Rum Jungle found that capping which was supposed to help contain this radioactive waste for at least 100 years, had failed in less than 20 years.

The Territory and Federal Governments continue to argue over responsibility for funding rehabilitation on the polluted East Finniss River

Contamination of local groundwater has yet to be addressed.

Brown's Oxide Project
In December 2001, Compass Resources lodged a Referral under the EPBC Act with Environment Australia (which is now DEH). That document referred to the proposed development of a large-scale mining project, the Browns Polymetallic Project, that would produce lead, cobalt, copper, nickel and silver over a project life of at least 15 years. As indicated in the 2001 Referral, Compass considered that the Browns Polymetallic Project was a ‘nuclear action’ under the EPBC Act, on the basis that the project could be considered to include rehabilitating a facility or area in which mining or milling of uranium ore has previously been undertaken.

Compass suspended its work on the polymetallic proposal in 2002 when low metal prices caused the withdrawal of Compass’s financial partner (Doe Run).

In 2005, Compass lodged an application for a much smaller project focussing on cobalt, nickel and copper mining. Because this project, the Brown's Oxide Project is much smaller than the polymetallic project proposed previously, Compass is in a position to progress it on its own.

The Northern Territory Government has completed assessing this project and Ms Marion Scrymgour MLA, Minister for Natural Resources, Environment and Heritage in the Northern Territory Government has advised that she has concluded that the Browns Oxide Project as proposed in the Public Environmental Report and subsequent documents "can be managed without unacceptable environmental impacts"

The Hon. Kon Vatskalis MLA Minister for Mines and Energy announced this approval as "good news" during question time in the Northern Territory Parliament on 4 May 2006. To ensure the environment is managed properly, this approval and its recommendations is subject to final review by the Commonwealth Government under a bilateral agreement between the Northern Territory Government and the Commonwealth of Australia.

Pending final Commonwealth approval, the project is set to be in production by early 2007.

While the project is located near the old Rum Jungle mine, the Browns Oxide Project is targeting copper cobalt and nickel—not uranium. Nonetheless, Compass acknowledges that at some future point it would be interested in mining uranium at the nearby Rum Jungle site (over which it holds a lease). Any proposal to mine uranium would require a totally new application and environmental assessment as a separate project.

Geology
The major uranium prospects of Brown's, Intermediate, White's, White's extension and Dyson's occur northwest of, but parallel to, the northeast trending Giant's Reef Fault.  Ore deposits occur in Precambrian carbonaceous slate and graphitic schist of the Lower Proterozoic Brooks Creek Group.  Structurally, the deposits are within a sheared anticline on the southern flank of a granite dome.  Primary minerals include chalcopyrite, bornite, bournonite, pyrite, and uraninite.  Oxidized ores include azurite, malachite, pseudomalachite, iron oxides, torbernite, saleeite, and phosphuranylite.

See also
 Cave Divers Association of Australia

References

External links 

 - company web site
Rum Jungle data at Mindat.org
Rum Jungle mine site, Department of Resources at Government of the Northern Territory

Uranium mines in the Northern Territory
Mining towns in the Northern Territory
Surface mines in Australia
Underground mines in Australia
Mines in the Northern Territory
Underwater diving sites in Australia
Diving quarries